Fulvio Caldini (born 1959) is an Italian composer, pianist and musicologist. Since the 1980s, he has created a large body of works, which are generally composed according to minimalist principles, showing particular influence from the music of Steve Reich. Caldini has a preference for wind instruments (particularly double reeds) in his compositions, frequently writing for his brother Sandro Caldini, who plays the oboe, oboe d'amore and cor anglais (English horn).

Caldini's music is published by Bèrben Edition, Flautando Edition, Moeck Verlag and Edition Tre Fontane.

References

External links

1959 births
Living people
20th-century classical composers
21st-century classical composers
Italian classical composers
Italian male classical composers
Contemporary classical music performers
20th-century Italian composers
Italian male pianists
21st-century pianists
20th-century Italian male musicians
21st-century Italian male musicians